Ectogonia is a genus of moths of the family Erebidae. The genus was erected by George Hampson in 1896.

Species
Ectogonia albomaculalis Bremer, 1864
Ectogonia butleri Leech, 1900
Ectogonia curvipalpata Holloway, 2005
Ectogonia fumosa Hampson, 1926
Ectogonia viola Hampson, 1895

References

Calpinae